The Zee Cine Award Best Film is chosen by the Jury. The winners are announced in March.

Winners 

Zee Cine Awards